The 2019 North Carolina Tar Heels women's soccer team represented the University of North Carolina at Chapel Hill during the 2019 NCAA Division I women's soccer season. It was the 43rd season of the university fielding a program. The Tar Heels were led by 43rd year head coach Anson Dorrance.

The Tar Heels finished the season 24–2–1, 8–0–1 in ACC play to finish in first place.  As the first seed in the ACC Tournament, they defeated Notre Dame, NC State, and Virginia in order to be crowned champions.  They received an automatic bid to the NCAA Tournament where they defeated Belmont, Colorado, Michigan, USC, and Washington State before losing to Stanford in the Finals.

Squad

Roster 

Updated June 15, 2020

Team management 

Source:

Schedule

Source:

|-
!colspan=7 style=""| Non-Conference Regular season

|-
!colspan=7 style=""| ACC Regular season

|-
!colspan=7 style=""| ACC Tournament

|-
!colspan=7 style=""| NCAA Tournament

2020 NWSL College Draft

Source:

Rankings

References 

2019 in sports in North Carolina
North Carolina
North Carolina Tar Heels women's soccer seasons
North Carolina
NCAA Division I Women's Soccer Tournament College Cup seasons